Miners in The Sky is a 1967 science fiction novel by American writer Murray Leinster.

Plot summary
The rings around Thotmess, a gas giant in the system of the star Niletus where planets are called for Ancient Egyptian gods, is a completely lawless place. The only human inhabitants are rugged miners, riding small "donkey ships", who need to contend with both the harsh natural environment and fierce human competitors. "Claim jumping" is frequent and miners must be ready at any moment to take up a gun or a bazooka to defend their finds of "grey matrix in which abyssal crystals occur". (The reader is not told what this may be, except that it is evidently valuable enough to kill for.)

The extra-solar environment is chosen by Leinster in order to convey the feeling of an ever-expanding frontier - Sol's own Asteroid Belt has become "tame", as did the rings of Saturn, and the rough adventurous types move further on. (Leinster's  historical model is  the recurring Gold Rush of the Nineteenth Century, drawing adventurers in 1840s from the settled East Coast to wild California, and in 1890s from settled California to the wild Klondike.)

1967 American novels
1967 science fiction novels
Novels by Murray Leinster